Nikolay Nikolaev (born 1 October 1992) is a Bulgarian footballer who plays as a midfielder for Lyubimets.

External links

1992 births
Living people
Bulgarian footballers
Bulgarian expatriate footballers
FC Etar 1924 Veliko Tarnovo players
SFC Etar Veliko Tarnovo players
First Professional Football League (Bulgaria) players
21st-century Russian politicians
Association football midfielders